This is a list of Swedish football clubs in European competition. Swedish clubs have participated since 2001, when Umeå IK entered the 2001–02 UEFA Women's Cup.

Statistics

 Most Women's Cup/Women's Champions League competitions appeared in: 9 – Umeå IK and FC Rosengård
 Most competitions appeared in overall: 9 – Umeå IK and FC Rosengård
 First match played: Umeå IK 1–0 Sparta Praha, 3 October 2001 (2001–02 UEFA Women's Cup group stage)
 Most matches played: 66 – Umeå IK
 Most match wins: 46 – Umeå IK
 Most match draws: 11 –  Umeå IK
 Most match losses: 14 – FC Rosengård

 Biggest win (match): 15 goals – Umeå IK 15–0 Newtonabbey Strikers W.F.C. (2003–04 UEFA Women's Cup group stage)
 Biggest win (aggregate): 12 goals – Linköpings FC 12–0 ŽNK Krka (2010–11 UEFA Women's Champions League second round)
 Biggest defeat (match): 5 goals – Olympique Lyonnais 5–0 FC Rosengård (2012–13 UEFA Women's Champions League quarter-finals)
 Biggest defeat (aggregate): 8 goals – FC Rosengård 0–8 Olympique Lyonnais (2012–13 UEFA Women's Champions League quarter-finals)

Appearances in UEFA competitions

Active competitions

UEFA Women's Champions League

If more than one team participated during a season, the league champion team is on top.

References

External links
UEFA Website
Rec.Sport.Soccer Statistics Foundation
 History (old page)  at SvFF
 History (current)  at SvFF
 Swedish UEFA Women's Champions League season  at SvFF

Women's football clubs in international competitions